Sipalinus is a genus of beetles belonging to the family Curculionidae.

Description
Sipalinus is composed of seven species, five from Africa and two from Eurasia and Australasia. These species are quite  large (up to 28 mm.) and robust, the basic colour is brownish, the surface is crusty looking, often heavily tuberculate and elytra are usually mottled with whitish and dark brown. Some species are wood bores, and may occasionally be found in wood used for crates or structural timbers.

List of species and subspecies
 Sipalinus gigas (Fabricius)
Sipalinus gigas gigas (Fabricius)
 Sipalinus gigas granulatus (Fabricius)
 Sipalinus yunnanensis
 Sipalinus guineensis (Fabricius)
 Sipalinus burmeisteri (Boheman)
 Sipalinus squalidus (Kolbe)
 Sipalinus aloysiisabaudiae (Camerano)
 Sipalinus auritvilli (Duvivier)
 Semiotus zonatus Candèze, 1874

References

 Vaurie, Patricia Weevils of the tribe Sipalini (Coleoptera, Curculionidae, Rhynchophorinae). Part 3, The genus Sipalinus. American Museum novitates; no. 2463
 Biolib

Dryophthorinae
Taxa named by Guy Anstruther Knox Marshall